Claymore is a fictional character from the G.I. Joe: A Real American Hero toyline and comic book series. He is the G.I. Joe Team's covert operations officer and debuted in 1986.

Profile
His real name is John Zullo, and his rank is that of captain O-3. Claymore was born in Manchester, Vermont.

Claymore attended and graduated at the top of his class from Dartmouth, majoring in Eastern Philosophy. He enlisted in the US Army and served three back-to-back tours in Southeast Asia as a U.S. Army Special Forces officer. His actions there are classified. He is an expert in NATO long distance sniper rifles, and all NATO and Warsaw Pact small arms. Claymore has mastered many forms of martial arts and is fluent in Japanese, Chinese, Vietnamese, and Portuguese. When asked to join the G.I. Joes, his only stipulation was that he be called in for special assignments only.

Toys
Claymore was first released as an action figure in 1986, as an exclusive in a special set from Toys R Us named "Special Mission: Brazil", alongside re-colored versions of Mainframe, Wet Suit, Leatherneck, and Dial Tone. The set included a cassette tape that detailed the secret mission.

Comics

Devil's Due
Claymore first appeared in G.I. Joe #26 (January 2004), in the series published by Devil's Due. He was assigned to the nation of Badhikstan under orders to get the nation's Prime Minister out of the country after it was taken over by The Coil. The Prime Minister held the activation chips to the country's nuclear arsenal in his cell phone. The Coil took the Prime Minister hostage, and Stalker brought in a team of Joes to aid Claymore in a rescue. Unfortunately, the mission was a bust, with the Coil getting their hands on the codes and forcing the Joes to retreat under threat of using the nuclear arsenal.

Claymore moved operations to the neighboring country. He was soon joined by Lt. Falcon, Dusty, Snake Eyes, and Scarlett. The five Joes ran a recon mission over the border to spy on some construction. They were attacked by Overkill and some Desert Vipers and captured. However, they were let go by the Crimson Twins in order not to cause an incident since Cobra just took control of Badhikstan from the Coil and did not want any retaliation from the Joes.

Claymore makes a cameo in a later issue, seen working out of the Joes' "Americana Museum" sub-base. At one point, Claymore is made director of G.I. Joe's overseas operations.

Claymore later returned to the US, where he tried to help oversee operations after Hawk was crippled in battle. After the Jugglers reconstructed the team, Claymore and Vorona were supposed to head back to Badhikstan, but stayed behind just long enough to help Duke, Snake Eyes, Scarlett, and Storm-Shadow escape federal pursuit.

America's Elite
Claymore appeared in the G.I. Joe Special Missions: Brazil one-shot (April 2007). Based in part on the Toys R Us exclusive set, the story involved Claymore teaming up with the same Joes from the set. The five Joes had been part of a disastrous mission to capture the Headman. Years later, the deceased Mainframe's protégé, Firewall, helped the Joes complete the mission.

During the "World War III" storyline, Claymore is deployed to Kazakhstan. Later, he is seen there fighting Cobra forces.

References

External links
 
 Claymore at JMM's G.I. Joe Comics Home Page

Fictional characters from Vermont
Fictional characters introduced in 1986
Fictional United States Army Special Forces personnel
Fictional military captains
Male characters in comics
G.I. Joe soldiers